The Antarctic Plateau, Polar Plateau or King Haakon VII Plateau is a large area of East Antarctica that extends over a diameter of about , and includes the region of the geographic South Pole and the Amundsen–Scott South Pole Station.

Exploration
This plateau was first sighted in 1903 during the  Discovery Expedition to the Antarctic, which was led by Robert Falcon Scott. Ernest Shackleton became the first to cross parts of this plateau in 1909 during his  Nimrod Expedition, which turned back in bad weather when it had reached a point   from the South Pole. Shackleton named this plateau the King Edward VII Plateau in honour of the king of the United Kingdom. In December 1911, while returning from the first journey to the South Pole, the Norwegian explorer Roald Amundsen decided to name this plateau the King Haakon VII Plateau in honour of the newly elected king of Norway.

The Antarctic Plateau was first observed and photographed from the air in 1929 by a Ford Trimotor aeroplane carrying four men on the first flight to the South Pole and back to the seacoast. The chief pilot of this flight was Bernt Balchen, a native of Norway, and the navigator and chief organizer of this expedition were Richard E. Byrd of Virginia, an officer in the U.S. Navy. The other two members of its crew were the co-pilot and the photographer.

Climate

Fauna
The nearly continuous frigid winds that blow across the Antarctic Plateau, especially in the austral winter, make the environment inhospitable to life.

Microbial abundance is low (<103 cells/ml of snowmelt). The microbial community is mainly composed of members of the Alphaproteobacteria class (e.g. Kiloniellaceae and Rhodobacteraceae), which is one of the most well-represented bacterial groups in marine habitats; Bacteroidota (e.g. Cryomorphaceae and Flavobacteriaceae); and Cyanobacteria. According to research, polar microorganisms should be considered as deposited not only airborne particles but also as active components of the snowpack ecology of the Antarctic Plateau.

No penguins live on the Antarctic Plateau, and few birds routinely fly over it, except mostly snow petrels and south polar skuas. There are very few land animals anywhere on the plateau, or the Antarctic in general; nematodes, springtails, mites, midges, humans and dogs.

See also
 Amundsen–Scott South Pole Station
 Dome A
 Dome C
 Concordia Station
 Dome F
 East Antarctic Ice Sheet
 Gamburtsev Mountain Range
 Plateau Station
 Pole of Inaccessibility (Antarctic research station)
 Ridge A
 Roald Amundsen
 Vostok Station

References

Plateaus of Antarctica
East Antarctica
Landforms of Queen Maud Land